"Ancient planter" was a term applied to early colonists who migrated to the Colony of Virginia in what is now the United States, when the colony was managed by the Virginia Company of London. They received land grants if they stayed in the colony for at least three years. Under the terms of the "Instructions to Governor Yeardley" (issued by the London Company in 1618), these colonists received the first land grants in Virginia.

History
These land grants constituted a dividend paid out by the Virginia Company of London, which was constituted as a joint stock company.  Under the terms of the Second Charter, issued in 1609, the Company offered shares for twelve pounds ten shillings per share, to be invested and reinvested for seven years.  Those men who ventured to Virginia in person, investing their time and risking their lives, would each be counted as holding one share.

In 1616, at the end of the administration of Sir Thomas Dale, the first dividend became due and payable to all who had invested, whether by the purchase of shares or by "personal adventure". However, since the colony had not prospered, there was no money to divide. Instead, the Company offered grants of land.

Those who had been brought at the Company's expense (as indentured servants) also received 100 acres for their "personal adventure", but in their case the land was subject to an annual rent of one shilling per 50 acres:

Colonists who arrived after the departure of Sir Thomas Dale were entitled to a lesser grant of 50 acres. The London Company reasoned that "... by the singular Industry and virtue of the said Sir Thomas Dale the former Difficulties and Dangers were in greatest part overcome to the great ease and security of such as have been since that time transported thither",.  In other words, those who had come earlier received twice as much land, supposedly in recognition of the greater risks and hardships they had endured.  Of course, reducing the size of the grant to 50 acres also saved the hard-pressed Company a great deal of money, and the later colonists can scarcely be said to have experienced the "great ease and security" mentioned by the Company; the death rate continued extremely high.

The phrase "ancient planter" was not an honorific; it was simply a descriptive term, as used in the "Instructions", for a planter of long standing.

According to a letter from John Rolfe dated January 1619/20: 
All the Ancient Planters being sett free have chosen places for their dividends according to the Comyssion. Which giveth all greate content, for now knowing their owne landes, they strive and are prepared to build houses & to clear their groundes ready to plant, which giveth great encouragement and the greatest hope to make the Colony florrish that ever yet happened to them.

Identification
Because the surviving historical records are incomplete, and sometimes demonstrably inaccurate, it is not possible to compile a definitive list of ancient planters.

The database of Colonial Land Office Patents at the Library of Virginia is the principal source of information as to the identities of those who received grants as ancient planters.  Though the record does not begin until 1623, when administration of the colony was taken over by the Crown, many of the subsequent patents identify "ancient planters", or provide information which shows that a tract of land must have been originally granted under the terms applying to Ancient Planters.

Additional information comes from the 1624/5 Muster, a census ordered as part of the handover of the colony from the Virginia Company to the Crown.  For some of the colonists, the census includes information on the year and ship of arrival. In many cases this valuable information is missing.

Also as part of the transition to Crown Colony status, a list of grants was compiled in 1625 and sent to London.  This list does not identify the ancient planters as such, but in some cases knowledge of the grant combined with information from other sources (e.g., knowledge of the date of arrival) is enough to show that the planter in question must have received the grant as an ancient planter.

Bibliography
Billings, Warren M. "An Account of George Percey," in The Old Dominion in the Seventeenth Century, pp. 22–27. UNC Press, 1975.
Boddie, John B. Colonial Surry. Baltimore, MD: Genealogical Publishing Co., 1974 .
Campbell, Charles. History of the Colony and Dominion of Virginia. Lippincott, 1860.
 Coldham, Peter W. The Complete Book of Emigrants 1607-1660. Baltimore, MD: Genealogical Publishing Co., 1987.
 Dorman, John F., ed. Adventurers of Purse and Person 1607-1624/5. First Families of Virginia, 1987.
 Hotten, John Camden. The Original Lists of Persons of Quality. Baltimore, MD: Genealogical Publishing Co., 1978.
 Hume, Ivor Noel. The Virginia Adventure: Roanoke to James Towne. New York: Alfred A. Knopf, 1994.

References

External links
Order of Descendants of Ancient Planters - List of Names

History of the Thirteen Colonies
 
Plantations (settlements or colonies)
Plantations in the United States